The 2011 Ligas Departamentales, the fifth division of Peruvian football (soccer), was played by variable number teams by Departament.

Liga Departamental de Amazonas

Zona Norte

Group A

Group B

Final

Zona Sur

First Stage

Second Stage

Final

Semifinals

Liga Departamental de Ancash

First stage

Second stage

Third stage

Fourth stage

Semifinals

Final

Liga Departamental de Apurímac

Liga Departamental de Arequipa

Liga Departamental de Ayacucho

Liga Departamental de Cajamarca

Liga Departamental del Callao

Liga Departamental de Cusco

Liga Departamental de Huancavelica

Liga Departamental de Huanuco

Liga Departamental de Ica

Liga Departamental de Junín

Liga Departamental de La Libertad

Liga Departamental de Lambayeque

First stage

Second stage

Semifinals

Final

Liga Departamental de Lima

Round of 18

Round of 16

Quarterfinals

Semifinals

Final

Liga Departamental de Loreto

Liga Departamental de Madre de Dios

First stage

Final

Liga Departamental Moquegua

Cuadrangular

Repechaje Final

Liga Departamental de Pasco

Group A

Group B

Semifinals

Final

Liga Departamental de Piura

Liga Departamental de Puno

Liga Departamental de San Martín

Zona Norte

Group A

Group B

Zona Centro

Group A

Group B

Zona Sur

Group A

Group B

Second Stage

Triangular Final

Liga Departamental de Tacna

Group A

Group B

Semifinals

Final

Liga Departamental de Tumbes

Standings

Liga Departamental de Ucayali

Quarterfinals

Cuadrangular Final

External links
 DeChalaca.com - copaperu.pe la información más completa del "fútbol macho" en todo el Perú

2011
5